Zhdanovsk may refer to:
Zhdanovsk, name of the city of Beylagan, Azerbaijan, until 1991
Zhdanovsk, name of the town of Zapolyarny, Murmansk Oblast, Russia, in 1956–1963

See also
 Zhdanov (disambiguation)